Rajkamal Prakashan is a noted publishing house of Hindi literature as well as English book publication. Established in 1947, the publishing house is headquartered in New Delhi, with branches in Patna, Ranchi, Prayagraj, Kolkata and some other locations.

Currently the publication has three other imprints besides Rajkamal Prakashan, Radhakrishna Prakashan, Lokbharti Prakashan and Banyan Tree Books, which publishes books in English.

Rajkamal is also a publisher for the Indian Council of Historical Research based in Delhi.

References

External links
 Rajkamal Prakashan, website

Book publishing companies of India
Companies based in Delhi
Publishing companies established in 1947
1947 establishments in India
Hindi